U.S. Route 1 (US 1) is a major north–south U.S. Route in the U.S. state of Massachusetts, traveling through Essex, Middlesex, Suffolk, Norfolk, and Bristol counties. The portion of US 1 south of Boston is also known as the Boston–Providence Turnpike, Washington Street, or the Norfolk and Bristol Turnpike, and portions north of Boston are known as the Northeast Expressway and the Newburyport Turnpike.

Route description
From the south, US 1 enters Massachusetts from Rhode Island, immediately entering the city of Attleboro. It closely parallels Interstate 95 (I-95) as it goes through the towns of North Attleborough, Plainville, Wrentham, Foxborough (where Gillette Stadium is), Walpole, Sharon, Norwood, and Westwood. US 1 then has a wrong-way concurrency with I-95 up to the interchange that is the southern terminus of I-93. US 1 then travels concurrently with I-93 from Canton through Downtown Boston; Route 3 joins the concurrency in Braintree. In Downtown Boston, Route 1A and Route 3 separate from US 1 to head toward Logan International Airport and Cambridge respectively, and I-93 and US 1 separate just after passing through the O'Neill Tunnel and crossing the Leonard P. Zakim Bunker Hill Memorial Bridge. US 1 continues north, crossing the Tobin Bridge as the Northeast Expressway and traveling through Chelsea, Revere, and Malden, then as a four- to six-lane expressway through Saugus, Lynnfield, and Peabody. The route through Saugus was once known for its abundance of kitschy roadside commercial architecture, including the  neon cactus of the Hilltop Steak House and tiki-styled Kowloon Restaurant. From Peabody, US 1 again closely parallels I-95 going through the towns of Danvers, Topsfield, Ipswich, Rowley, Newbury, and Newburyport. In Newburyport, US 1 has a mile-long freeway segment that bypasses downtown and the waterfront areas; Route 1A joins the freeway shortly before it crosses the Merrimack River, entering Salisbury and becoming a surface arterial again.  later, it enters the state of New Hampshire.

Route 1A runs alongside US 1 in four parts of the state.

History
US 1 in Massachusetts was constructed in sections throughout the 1930s partly by widening existing roads and also by constructing new right of ways to bypass more congested areas. Originally, most of the highway was two or three lanes in each direction, with numerous widening and improvements made over the years.

Turnpike era

Most of US 1 consists of two former turnpike roads—the Norfolk and Bristol Turnpike and the Newburyport Turnpike. The older roads that these turnpikes were meant to bypass are now mostly Route 1A.

The Newburyport Turnpike opened on February 11, 1805, and was constructed by a private company at a cost of $500,000 (equivalent to $ in ). The turnpike was used by stagecoaches and mail carriers for decades, but toll collection ceased in 1847 as parallel railroads attracted more use. Several sections were rebuilt to accommodate automobile traffic in the early 20th century, but it saw decreased use following the completion of I-95. The section in downtown Newsburyport was bypassed in 1934.

Massachusetts Route C1

In the early 1930s, Route C1 was designated as an alternate route of US 1 through Downtown Boston. The "C" indicated a city route. The C designation was apparently distinct to the Boston area. Route C1 ran along Brookline Avenue, Beacon Street, Embankment Road (modern Route 28), Charles Street, Lowell Street, Merrimac Street, and Cross Street to the west end of the Sumner Tunnel. In East Boston, it went via Porter Street to Chelsea Street then shifted to the William McClellan Highway (modern Route 1A). As Storrow Drive and the Central Artery opened in the 1950s, Route C1 was rerouted to follow portions of these highways. The Route C1 designation was removed in 1971, with US 1 taking over most of the alignment south of the Charles River, and Route 1A taking over most of the alignment north of the river. US 1 was later moved onto the Southeast Expressway leaving most of the former alignment of Route C1 south of the river as having no number.

Massachusetts Route 17

For a period of time during the 1950s, a segment of US 1 in Massachusetts and New Hampshire was routed onto what later became I-95. The roadway that had been US 1 was designated as Route 17 from Danvers to Salisbury and New Hampshire Route 17 (NH 17) for a short distance in Seabrook. Once the I-95 designation was adopted, Route 17 and NH 17 were restored to being US 1.

Northeast Expressway

The Northeast Expressway was planned to extend north, as part of I-95, from Saugus, through Lynn, Lynnfield and Peabody. The highway would bisect the Saugus Marsh and Lynn Woods Reservation. The highway would then connect with the present junction of I-95 and Route 128 in Peabody. The Northeast Expressway was planned to carry the I-95 designation from Charlestown to Peabody. The first section of the expressway built was the Tobin Bridge over the Mystic River, which opened in 1950. In various stages, the Chelsea and Revere portions opened from 1956 to 1958. The highway carried the I-95 designation from 1955 (in its planning stages) to 1973. It was among the canceled highways affected by Governor Francis Sargent's February 1970 moratorium on expressway construction within Route 128. US 1 replaced I-95 on the Northeast Expressway, in the 1970s after I-95 joined Route 128 from Westwood to Peabody around Boston.

Relocation in Boston
In the late 1980s, at the request of the Metropolitan District Commission (now the Department of Conservation and Recreation) in an attempt to reduce the incidence of overheight vehicles finding their way onto Storrow Drive, US 1 was moved onto I-93 south of and through Boston, leaving the old route—Veterans of Foreign Wars Parkway (VFW Parkway), Jamaicaway, Riverway, and Storrow Drive through Dedham, Chestnut Hill, West Roxbury, Jamaica Plain, and central Boston—without a number. There are still some street signs incorrectly indicating the former alignment as US 1, and many local residents still refer to parts of VFW Parkway and Jamaicaway as "Route 1", as if it still runs along its old trajectory.

Saugus–Revere proposed widening

In the early 2010s, the Massachusetts Department of Transportation (MassDOT) proposed a $137-million (equivalent to $ in ) project to widen the existing  four-lane highway section to six lanes, from north of Route 99 in Saugus to south of Route 60 in Revere. The proposal consisted of adding a  travel lane and  shoulder in each direction. Work would also include reconstruction of the Copeland Circle interchange by eliminating the existing rotary, and demolition of the existing 1957 bridges from the never-built highway extension. The Lynn Street/Salem Street interchange in Malden, and the Route 99 interchange in Saugus, were slated to be reconstructed. Major rock blasting would be required for the project due to a massive ledge next to the highway, and seven bridges would be replaced and three others upgraded to handle the new lanes. In 2012, $10 million (equivalent to $ in ) was added to the state budget with the intent to be used for design costs and pulling permits for US 1. The project was expected to begin in 2012, but no further movement by the state has been implemented. Since then, town officials have made the push to ask MassDOT to revisit the project and begin development.

Major intersections

See also 
 New England road marking system
 List of U.S. Highways in Massachusetts

References

External links 

 U.S. Route 1 at Alps' Roads

01
 1 Massachusetts
Transportation in Bristol County, Massachusetts
Transportation in Norfolk County, Massachusetts
Transportation in Suffolk County, Massachusetts
Transportation in Middlesex County, Massachusetts
Transportation in Essex County, Massachusetts
Foxborough, Massachusetts
North Attleborough, Massachusetts
Plainville, Massachusetts
Historic trails and roads in Dedham, Massachusetts